The Young Earl of Essex’s Victory Over the Emperor of Germany is Child Ballad 288. With variations, the main story tells of an earl who goes to sea and confronts the German ships.  The earl defeats the German emperor's son.

Synopsis

The earl takes to sea. In some variants, his love, Nelly, pleads him to stay and reminds him of what happened to Benbow. Soon after departing, the earl comes across the ships of the German emperor.  They hail each other, and the earl's proud greeting causes the emperor's son to ask for ships to go against him.  They fight, and the earl defeats and capture's the emperor's son.  The emperor tries to ransom him back, but the earl insists on bringing him prisoner before the queen.

See also 
 List of the Child Ballads
 Scottish mythology
 English folklore

References

External links
The Young Earl of Essex’s Victory Over the Emperor of Germany

Child Ballads
Border ballads
Northumbrian folklore
Anglo-Scottish border
Year of song unknown
Songwriter unknown